The Rolls-Royce Silent Shadow is an upcoming full-sized luxury car manufactured by Rolls-Royce Motor Cars. It is intended to be one of company's few upcoming electric vehicles.

Overview
The Silent Shadow is prefigured by the Rolls-Royce 103EX Concept car, which was presented in 2016 on the occasion of the centenary of the parent company BMW. On 31 May 2021, Rolls-Royce Motor Cars announced the name of one of their electric vehicles in history. The Silent Shadow is named after the Rolls-Royce Silver Shadow which was produced between 1965 and 1980.

References

Full-size vehicles
Silent Shadow
Rear-wheel-drive vehicles
Limousines
Sedans
Electric car models
Upcoming car models